Valerie Trueblood is an American writer. Among her notable works is her debut novel Seven Loves and the short story collection Search Party: Stories of Rescue (Counterpoint 2013), a finalist for the 2014 PEN/Faulkner Award. Her story collection Marry or Burn (Counterpoint 2010) was a finalist for the Frank O'Connor International Short Story Prize.,

References

American women novelists
21st-century American novelists
Living people
21st-century American women writers
PEN/Faulkner Award for Fiction winners
Year of birth missing (living people)